Radoslav Brzobohatý (13 September 1932 – 12 September 2012) was a Czech film and television actor.

Brzobohatý was born in Vrútky, Czechoslovakia. He appeared in many Czech TV shows, including 30 Cases of Major Zeman, Ulice and the film Sněženky a machři. He was the father of actor and television personality Ondřej Brzobohatý, the host of Česko hledá SuperStar, the Czech version of the Idol series. Brzobohatý died in Prague, Czech Republic in September 2012 at the age of 79.

He is buried at the Vyšehrad Cemetery in Prague.

Selected filmography
 Mstitel (1959)
 Bílá spona (1960)
 Hvězda zvaná Pelyněk (1964)
 Všichni dobří rodáci (All My Compatriots) (1968)
 Ucho (1970)
 Do Be Quick (1977)
 Noc smaragdového měsíce (1985)
 Zostane to medzi nami (2003)

References

External links

1932 births
2012 deaths
People from Vrútky
Czech male film actors
Czech male stage actors
Czech male television actors